The Shinto shrew (Sorex shinto) is a species of shrew of the genus Sorex that lives only on the islands of Japan. It is a mole-like mammal with a pointed snout, very small ears, and a relatively long tail. Like most shrews, it is tiny, has poor eyesight, and a very good sense of hearing and smell which it uses to locate its prey, mainly insects.

At one time, the Shinto shrew was classified as a subspecies of the Sorex caecutiens, or Laxmann's shrew, however as scientists collected new data on these shrews, such as genetic testing, it was decided that they should be classified as a separate species.

There are three distinct populations of Shinto shrew living on the islands of Japan. Living as isolated groups on their respective islands prevents the populations from interbreeding and can allow variations to develop between the groups over time. Because of these differences, the three groups have been classified as subspecies of S. shinto. Those living on Sado Island are S. shinto sadonis, those living on Shikoku Island are S. shinto shikokensis, and those living on Japan's main island of Honshu are S. shinto shinto.

Genetics 
Shinto shrew karyotype comprises diploid number of 42 chromosomes, the same as in the case of Laxmann's shrew. A fundamental number equals to 66, as in the case of Laxmann's shrew from Hokkaido. Pairs from 1 to 9 are big metacentric or submetacentric chromosomes, and were numeratoed according to their size. Thus, the chromosome of 1st and 2nd pair are the biggest. They are metacentric and can't me discerned morfologically. A 4th pair is metacentric too. On the other side, pairs 3, 5 and 8 are submetacentric. Consecutive 9 pairs comprise telocentric chromosomes. Ones belonging to pairs from 10 to 12 are greater than others, with relatively bigger short arms. A 16th pair is submetacentric too, in contrast to telocentric pairs 17 and 19. A satellites can be found in 17th pair and, more pronounced, in 20th pair, in the end of p arm. The satellites function as active NOR. Description of chromosomes is nearly precisely the same in Long-clawed shrew, besides some local differences in the later. Authors emphasize genetic proximity of shinto and Laxmann's shrews. X chromosome resembles a homological one of Cheju Island Laxmann's shrew according to G stripes. A kariotype observed in the shinto and Laxmann's shrews is thought to be ancestral for all Laxmann's shrew species group.

Morphology 

In general appearance the shinto shrew looks similar do Laxmann's shrew, previously thought to be included in. However, it is smaller than Laxmann's shrew, but larger than Azumi shrew. Shinto shrew head and body measure between 5.1 and 7.25 cm. Tail reaches from 4.4 to 5.7 cm, what makes its smaller than in Azumi shrew. Head length from incisors to occipital condyles is 1.65-1.81 cm. Teeth rows measures from 3.9 to 4.4 mm. Hind foot is 1.14-1.36 cm. Mass belongs to 4.1-6.2 g.

Dorsum is gray-brown.

Shinto shrew resembles Laxmann's shrew. Traits of the shinto shrew from Honshu gradually comes into traits of Laxmann's shrew from Primorsky Krai and Corea (head size) and from Sacchalin and Hokkaido (external measures). However, aforementioned species can be distinguished even by a surface of 4th superior premolar. Only subspecies S. s. sadonis recognizing is problematic.

Systematics  
The shinto shrew was described by Oldfield Thomas in 1905, who pointed out as a type locality a village Makado (now part of small town Noheji) in Aomori Prefecture, northern Hondo (former name of Honsiu), Japan. However, shinto shrew was not announced as a separate species, but as a subspecies of Laxmann's shrew, a shrew species common in Asia and of wide range and numerous described subspecies. Nowadays, the shinto shrew and Laxmann's shrew are considered different species, although closely related, what was proved by genetic research. Difference between species is not evident according to some authors. Others, basing on genetical data, recognize them as separate species belonging to the same species group  and of common ancestry. The group is called caecutiens/shinto species group. The fird species closely related to the two mentioned before is chinese shrew. The trio with taiga shrew and long-clawed shrew make caecutiens species group. It is, among few other species group and species that belongs to no species group, classified in Sorex Sorex subgenus, one of tho subgenera of genus Sorex. That genus belongs to a tribe Soricini, which, altogether with tribes Blarinini, Blarinellini, Anourosoricini, Notiosoricini i Nectogalini, creates Soricinae subfamily, one of three subfamily of Soricid family, next to Crocidurinae and Myosoricinae.

A cladogram according to Naitoh et al,. 2005

Nowadays, 3 subspecies are enlisted:
 Sorex shinto shinto Thomas, 1905;
 Sorex shinto sadonis Yoshiyuki & Imaizumi, 1986;
 Sorex shinto shikokensis Abe, 1967.

According to some authors, S. shinto sadonis can't be genetically distinguished from a nominative subspecies and it could appear recently. Other authors point out its genetic separateness from Honsku and Shikoku populations. What is more, few researched individuals don't fit former nor latter group, such ones are classified as S. shinto shikokensis.

Wedle niektórych autorów S. shinto sadonis jest genetycznie nieodróżnialny od podgatunku nominatywnego, być może powstały niedawno, inni wskazują na jego odrębność genetyczną od populacji zamieszkującej Honsiu i Shikoku. Ponadto nieliczne zbadane osobniki nie pasują do żadnej z tych grup, te właśnie tworzą podgatunek S. shinto shikokensis.

Another subspecies Sorex shinto chouei was previously described, but is seems to be a junior synonym of  Sorex shinto shinto. Sorex shinto saevus described by Thomas, 1907 from Sakhalin, is nowadays recognized as synonym of long-clawed shrew.

Behaviour and life cycle 
Soricids usually lead a solitary life. There is no research concerning this area in the case of the shinto shrew. It lives on the ground,  in the litter. Majority of caught specimens was active nightly, but in high altitude activity occurred daily.

A female copulates with a male and after it she gets pregnant. Gravid females of Sorex shinto shinto subspecies were met on Honshu in May and June. Pregnant Sorex shinto sadonis females were observed from March to May. After pregnancy female gives birth to from one to six neonates in the case of nominatibe species and from four to six in the case of Sorex shinto sadonis.

A soricids usually do not live long. One generation is estimated to 1 year.

Area 
THe shinto shrew is endemic to Japan. It lives on Honshu (Kii Peninsula), Shikoku and Sado Islands. The nominative subspecies dwells in northern and central mountain areas on Honshu, on middle and high altitude. Sorex shinto shikokensis lives on Shikoku, more precisely in Ishizuchi and Tsurugi Mountains. Aforementioned Sado Island is home of Sorex shinto sadonis, which is also observed on western Honshu seashore, not only in mountains, but also in lower.

Shinto shrew fossils dated on Pleistocene were found on Honshu and the ones from late Pleistocene on Kyushu. The shinto shrew is sympatric with Laxmann's shrew.

Ecology 
A habitats of shinto shrew are primary and secondary forests, especially coniferous, and shrubland. It could be observed in lower altitudes, even on the sea level, however, it is more frequently met in mountains, it can reach 2900 m above sea level. On the sea level it lives on Honshu, its maximum altitude on that island is 1200 m. On Shikoku it dwells from 0 do 900 m. On Sado Island it was met on 300 m above sea level.

There is no specific data concerning diet of the shinto shrew. Closely related Laxmann's shrew eats spiders, beetles, Oniscidea and caterpillars.

Parasites of the shinto shrew can be nematodes, as Parastrongyloides winchesi and Syphacia, probably Syphacia emileromani, however in the latter case shrew were probably accidental hosts of mice parasite after consumption of its corpse.

Status and conservation 
Population trend is table. IUCN does not give data concerning population number. Is some places the shinto shrew is abundant, like northern and central Honshu, where, as highlighted by IUCN, Izumi shrew does not occur, and Sado Island. On the other hand, on Shikoku the shinto shrew is rare and can be found only on high latitudes. It is sympatric with the Izumi shrew on Honshu. A bulk of the shinto shrew area is protected. IUCN does not mention any threats and classifies the shinto shrew as a species of least concern (LC).

References

Mammals of Japan
Endemic fauna of Japan
Sorex
Mammals described in 1905
Taxa named by Oldfield Thomas
Shrews
Taxonomy articles created by Polbot